Kokino is a rural locality (a village) in Komarichsky District, Bryansk Oblast, Russia. The population was 461 as of 2010. There are 3 streets.

Geography 
Kokino is located 9 km north of Komarichi (the district's administrative centre) by road. Radogoshch is the nearest rural locality.

References 

Rural localities in Komarichsky District
Sevsky Uyezd